Procometis phloeodes is a moth of the  family Autostichidae. It is known from New South Wales and Queensland.

The wingspan is about 20 mm. The forewings are streaked dark brown.

References

Procometis
Moths described in 1898
Moths of Queensland